Disease is the third studio album by American hardcore punk band Beartooth. It was released on September 28, 2018, through Red Bull Records and UNFD. The album was announced on July 18, 2018, following the leak of one of the songs ("Infection") that is featured on the album. The band then released two (official) singles on July 23: "Disease" and "Bad Listener". On September 7, their third single, "Manipulation", was released. On January 18, 2019, "You Never Know" was released as their fourth single along with its music video.

Background

Production
Caleb Shomo is the lead vocalist, guitarist, bassist, drummer and the lyricist. According to Shomo, the process for developing this album was difficult compared to the others as Shomo explored outside the confines of his basement. Shomo says "I wanted to get a different vibe on this record," meaning he chose to go to studios around the world. His regular strategy for a song he was working on was to write them in his basement and play them on programmed instruments to get a feel for how it would sound and play it on actual instruments later: working on "Disease" being actual studio gave him the opportunity to play on the instruments immediately and get the sounds he wanted faster.

Composition

Themes
Shomo wanted to address the futility in his life and not hide it, he wanted to produce songs that feel real: with his other album, Aggressive, he felt he was faking being happy and that nothing was wrong. With "Disease", he didn't want to lie anymore and instead dive back into his emotions and express it through the music to produce a track that felt honest and relatable. Shomo, during the 2018 tour promoting Disease, would give a small speech before every show expressing the need to be aware of depression, and, if you feel depressed, to talk to someone. Each speech varied in content; all of them were inspired by a great friend of his, Kyle Pavone from We Came as Romans, who died from overdosing. Shomo, a year and half before a speech he gave on October 1, 2018, while contemplating suicide, developed the idea that depression is a disease.

Track listing

Personnel
Beartooth
 Caleb Shomo – vocals, production, mixing
 Kamron Bradbury – guitar, additional production
 Oshie Bichar – bass guitar, additional production
 Zach Huston – guitar
 Connor Denis – drums

Additional contributors
 Nick Raskulinecz – production, executive production
 Zakk Cervini – production (6, 10)
 Ted Jensen – mastering
 Peter Geiser – engineering
 Nick Fancher – photography

Charts

References

2018 albums
Beartooth (band) albums
Red Bull Records albums